Cedar Grove is an unincorporated community in Frederick County, Virginia, United States. Cedar Grove lies at the intersection of Cedar Grove, Saint Clair, and Old Baltimore Roads.

References

Unincorporated communities in Frederick County, Virginia
Unincorporated communities in Virginia